Felipe dos Reis Pereira Vizeu do Carmo (born 12 March 1997), known as just Felipe Vizeu, is a Brazilian professional footballer who plays as a forward for Atlético Goianiense. He has been a member of Brazil U20 team with 10 appearances.

Career
Felipe started his youth career at América (MG) in 2011, but after standing out moved to Flamengo in 2013.

Flamengo

Early career
At Flamengo Felipe had a successful youth career, peaking with the title of the 2016 Copa São Paulo de Futebol Júnior, the most important youth tournament in Brazil. Felipe became one of the most important players in the championship campaign being selected as the highlight player of the tournament.

2016 season
Vizeu debuted in the professional team on 10 February 2016 in the 2016 Rio de Janeiro State League 5–0 win against Portuguesa (RJ). Few days later on 24 February he scored his first goal for Flamengo in a 1–0 win over Cabofriense also for the 2016 Rio State League.

In March 2016 Felipe has been promoted to the professional squad due to the transfer of Kayke to Yokohama F. Marinos leaving the club with only Paolo Guerrero to play as striker.

Felipe played his first Série A match and also scored his first goal in a 2–2 draw against Chapecoense on 25 May 2016 at Estádio Raulino de Oliveira. He finished his first season with 15 Série A appearances and 5 goals.

2017 season
Vizeu scored his first goal in a continental competition on 9 August 2017 in the 5–0 win against Palestino for the second round of the 2017 Copa Sudamericana. He scored again in the quarterfinals second leg 3–3 draw against Fluminense. In the semifinals Vizeu hit the net again, this time in both legs against Junior, once in the first leg at Estádio do Maracanã and twice in the second leg at Estadio Metropolitano Roberto Meléndez.

Udinese
On 7 February 2018 Udinese signed with Vizeu a five-year contract paying a US$6m transfer fee, although Vizeu will only move to the Italian club on 1 July 2018.

Grêmio (loan)
On 12 January 2019, Vizeu joined Grêmio on loan until 31 January 2020.

Athletico Paranaense (loan)
On 4 January 2020, Udinese announced that Vizeu would be loaned to Athletico Paranaense until 31 December 2020, but the deal was cancelled a few days later.

Akhmat Grozny (loan)
On 16 January 2020, Russian club Akhmat Grozny announced that they signed a contract with Vizeu, who joined them on loan until 31 December 2020 with an option to make the transfer permanent at the end of it. On 7 July 2020, he scored his first goal for Akhmat to give his team a 2–1 away victory over FC Tambov. His loan was terminated on 17 September 2020.

Ceará (loan)
On 18 October 2020, Vizeu joined Ceará on loan, until 30 June 2021.

Sheriff Tiraspol
On 30 August 2022, Vizeu signed with Sheriff Tiraspol in Moldova.

International career

On 18 July 2016 Brazil U23 head coach Rogério Micale announced that Vizeu had been chosen as one of the alternate players for the 2016 Summer Olympics. Vizeu received his first call-up to play for Brazil U20 on 16 August 2016.

Career statistics

Club

Honours
Flamengo
 Campeonato Carioca: 2017

Grêmio
 Campeonato Gaúcho: 2019

Ceará
 Copa do Nordeste: 2020

Individual
 Copa Sudamericana topscorer: 2017

References

External links

1997 births
Living people
Sportspeople from Rio de Janeiro (state)
Brazilian footballers
Association football forwards
Brazil under-20 international footballers
Campeonato Brasileiro Série A players
Serie A players
Russian Premier League players
CR Flamengo footballers
Udinese Calcio players
Grêmio Foot-Ball Porto Alegrense players
Ceará Sporting Club players
FC Akhmat Grozny players
Yokohama FC players
FC Sheriff Tiraspol players
Brazilian expatriate footballers
Brazilian expatriate sportspeople in Italy
Expatriate footballers in Italy
Brazilian expatriate sportspeople in Russia
Expatriate footballers in Russia
Brazilian expatriate sportspeople in Japan
Expatriate footballers in Japan
Brazilian expatriate sportspeople in Moldova
Expatriate footballers in Moldova
People from Três Rios